Abu Rawash (also spelled Abu Roach, Abu Roash;   ,  , , "flesh of sensual pleasures"),  north of Giza, is the site of Egypt's most northerly pyramid, also known as the lost pyramid – the mostly ruined Pyramid of Djedefre, the son and successor of Khufu. Originally, it was thought that this pyramid had never been completed, but the current archaeological consensus is that not only was it completed, but that it was built about the same size as the Pyramid of Menkaure – the third largest of the Giza pyramids. It is the location of the northernmost pyramid in Egypt (known as Lepsius Number One), the pyramid of Djedefre (also known as Radjedef) and around fifty mastabas (located one and a half kilometres from Djedefre’s pyramid).

Location

Its location adjacent to a major crossroads made it an easy source of stone. Quarrying, which began in Roman times, has left little apart from a few courses of stone superimposed upon the natural hillock that formed part of the pyramid's core.

Geology of Abu Rawash
The sedimentary succession in Abu Rawash area ranges in age from Late Cretaceous to Quaternary but is punctuated by several unconformity surfaces. Turonian to Coniacian representing the sedimentary succession of Abu Rawash formation that differentiated into six informal units (members) from younger to older as follows:
Basal clastic member
Rudist-bearing limestone-marl member
Limestone member
Actaeonella-bearing limestone-marl member
Flint-bearing chalky limestone member
Plicatula-bearing marl-limestone member.
Sedimentary depositional environment of Abu Rawash Formation are characterized by variable conditions and settings ranging from lower mixed to upper intertidal flat and subtidal channel for the clastic facies and calm to agitated open marine inner to middle platform for the carbonate facies.
Vertical sequence or facies hierarchy display that the facies sequence of the basal clastic member indicates a progradational peritidal sequence. While those of the rudist-bearing member and limestone member represent a cyclic progradation of high energetic/storm facies above an open marine low energetic fore shoal subtidal facies. The facies sequence of the Acteonella-bearing member reflects two facies associations comprising open marine subtidal assemblage and shoal or bank facies. The latter facies represents the bank that the robust thick shelled Durania arnaudi with the coralline sponge heads accreted local mounds in restricted areas El-Hassana dome. The vertical facies hierarchy of the flint-bearing chalky limestone member suggests a renewed shoaling of the depositional accommodation, shifting to inner-platform setting and a progradation of mobile bioclastic shoals or banks. The stacking of the sedimentary facies in the Plicatula-bearing member indicates an accumulation in an open shallow sea (inner platform) with intermittent supply of fine terrigenous clastics and clays. (Hanan.S.M. Badawy, Geology Dept., Faculty of Science, Beni Suef, Egypt)

Mastabas 
The first burials in the area date to the First Dynasty. There is a large Thinite necropolis at the site and a number of objects bearing the names of Hor-Aha and Den were found in the area.

Unlike the fourth dynasty mastabas of Giza which sit very close to the pyramids and seem to have been built to a plan in advance, the fourth dynasty necropolis at Abu Rawash (cemetery F) lies some distance from Djedefre’s pyramid and the mastabas seem to have been built to order and laid out in a more haphazard manner.

Most of the mastabas are composed of external walls made up of large blocks layered around a bedrock core with the upper sections filled in with loose masonry. On the east side there is a cult niche to the north and a L-shaped chapel to the south. Some of the southern chapels have brick annexes to extend them. Many of the tombs are anonymous but some bear the names of their owners and some artifacts have been recovered also bearing these names; for example an alabaster offering table dedicated to Hornit.

See also
List of ancient Egyptian towns and cities
List of ancient Egyptian sites
List of megalithic sites

References

External links

Newsweek's Interactive Graphic on Djedefre's pyramid with Interactive Timeline of the major pyramids of ancient Egypt
Information with interactive map, videos & photos of Abu Roash at Talking Pyramids
 Ministry of Environment Egyptian Environmental Affairs Agency - Natural Protectorates Description